Jan Gasche (born 29 December 1906, date of death unknown) was a Czech sports shooter. He competed in the 25 m pistol event at the 1936 Summer Olympics.

References

1906 births
Year of death missing
Czech male sport shooters
Olympic shooters of Czechoslovakia
Shooters at the 1936 Summer Olympics
Place of birth missing